Micaria is a genus of ground spiders that was first described by Niklas Westring in 1851.

They are often called "ant spiders" due to their ant-like appearance and ant mimicking behavior.

Species
 it contains 105 species and two subspecies found in the Holarctic, Indomalayan, Australasian and Afrotropical zoogeographic regions:

M. aborigenica Mikhailov, 1988 – Russia (north-eastern Siberia)
M. aciculata Simon, 1895 – Russia (South Siberia)
M. aenea Thorell, 1871 – North America, Europe, Russia (Europe to Far East), Kazakhstan
M. albofasciata Hu, 2001 – China
M. albovittata (Lucas, 1846) – Europe, Turkey, Caucasus, Russia (Europe to Central Asia), Iran, Turkmenistan, China
M. alpina L. Koch, 1872 – USA (Alaska), Canada, Europe, Russia (Europe to Far East), Japan
M. alxa Tang, Urita, Song & Zhao, 1997 – China
M. beaufortia (Tucker, 1923) – South Africa
M. belezma Bosmans, 2000 – Algeria
M. blicki Kovblyuk & Nadolny, 2008 – Ukraine
M. bonneti Schenkel, 1963 – Mongolia, China
M. bosmansi Kovblyuk & Nadolny, 2008 – Ukraine, Russia (Europe)
M. braendegaardi Denis, 1958 – Afghanistan
M. brignolii (Bosmans & Blick, 2000) – Portugal, France
M. browni Barnes, 1953 – USA
M. camargo Platnick & Shadab, 1988 – Mexico
M. capistrano Platnick & Shadab, 1988 – USA, Mexico
M. charitonovi Mikhailov & Ponomarev, 2008 – Kazakhstan
M. chrysis (Simon, 1910) – South Africa
M. cimarron Platnick & Shadab, 1988 – USA
M. coarctata (Lucas, 1846) – Mediterranean, Eastern Europe, Caucasus, Russia (Europe to Far East), Kazakhstan, Central Asia
M. coloradensis Banks, 1896 – USA, Canada
M. connexa O. Pickard-Cambridge, 1885 – China (Yarkand)
M. constricta Emerton, 1894 – North America, Svalbard, Russia (Northern Europe to Middle Siberia)
M. corvina Simon, 1878 – Algeria, Tunisia, Israel
M. croesia L. Koch, 1873 – Australia (New South Wales)
M. cyrnea Brignoli, 1983 – France (Corsica), Italy, Greece
M. delicatula Bryant, 1941 – USA
M. deserticola Gertsch, 1933 – USA, Mexico
M. dives (Lucas, 1846) – Europe, Turkey, Israel, Caucasus, Russia (Europe to Far East), Central Asia, India, China, Korea, Japan
Micaria d. concolor (Caporiacco, 1935) – Karakorum
M. donensis Ponomarev & Tsvetkov, 2006 – Russia (Europe)
M. elizabethae Gertsch, 1942 – USA, Canada
M. emertoni Gertsch, 1935 – North America
M. faltana Bhattacharya, 1935 – India
M. formicaria (Sundevall, 1831) – Europe, Turkey, Caucasus, Russia (Europe to Far East), Kazakhstan, China
M. foxi Gertsch, 1933 – USA, Canada
M. fulgens (Walckenaer, 1802) (type) – Europe, Caucasus, Russia (Europe to South Siberia), Central Asia, China
M. funerea Simon, 1878 – Spain, France (Corsica), Bulgaria, Russia (Caucasus)
M. galilaea Levy, 2009 – Israel
M. gertschi Barrows & Ivie, 1942 – USA, Canada
M. gomerae Strand, 1911 – Canary Is.
M. gosiuta Gertsch, 1942 – USA, Mexico
M. gulliae Tuneva & Esyunin, 2003 – Russia (Europe), Kazakhstan
M. guttigera Simon, 1878 – Portugal, Spain, France
M. guttulata (C. L. Koch, 1839) – Europe, Russia (Europe to Far East), Kazakhstan, Kyrgyzstan
M. icenoglei Platnick & Shadab, 1988 – USA
M. idana Platnick & Shadab, 1988 – USA, Canada
M. ignea (O. Pickard-Cambridge, 1872) – Canary Is., Algeria, Spain, Greece (Crete), Cyprus, Egypt, Yemen, Israel, Syria, Iran, Central Asia
M. imperiosa Gertsch, 1935 – USA, Mexico
M. inornata L. Koch, 1873 – Australia
M. japonica Hayashi, 1985 – Russia (Far East), Korea, Japan
M. jeanae Gertsch, 1942 – USA, Mexico
M. jinlin Song, Zhu & Zhang, 2004 – China
M. kopetdaghensis Mikhailov, 1986 – Caucasus to Central Asia
M. langtry Platnick & Shadab, 1988 – USA
M. lassena Platnick & Shadab, 1988 – USA
M. laticeps Emerton, 1909 – USA, Canada
M. lenzi Bösenberg, 1899 – Europe, Caucasus, Russia (Europe to South and north-eastern Siberia), Central Asia, China
M. lindbergi Roewer, 1962 – Afghanistan
M. logunovi Zhang, Song & Zhu, 2001 – China
M. longipes Emerton, 1890 – North America
M. longispina Emerton, 1911 – USA, Canada
M. marchesii (Caporiacco, 1936) – Libya
M. marusiki Zhang, Song & Zhu, 2001 – China
M. medica Platnick & Shadab, 1988 – USA, Canada
M. mexicana Platnick & Shadab, 1988 – Mexico
M. mongunica Danilov, 1997 – Russia (South Siberia)
M. mormon Gertsch, 1935 – North America
M. nanella Gertsch, 1935 – USA, Mexico
M. nivosa L. Koch, 1866 – Europe, Russia (Europe to South Siberia), Kazakhstan
M. nye Platnick & Shadab, 1988 – USA, Mexico
M. otero Platnick & Shadab, 1988 – USA
M. pallens Denis, 1958 – Afghanistan
M. pallida O. Pickard-Cambridge, 1885 – Tajikistan
M. palliditarsa Banks, 1896 – USA, Mexico
M. pallipes (Lucas, 1846) – Madeira, Mediterranean to Central Asia
M. palma Platnick & Shadab, 1988 – USA
M. palmgreni Wunderlich, 1980 – Finland
M. paralbofasciata Song, Zhu & Zhang, 2004 – China
M. pasadena Platnick & Shadab, 1988 – USA, Mexico
M. porta Platnick & Shadab, 1988 – USA, Mexico
M. pulcherrima Caporiacco, 1935 – India, Pakistan, Russia (South Siberia), China
Micaria p. flava Caporiacco, 1935 – Karakorum
M. pulicaria (Sundevall, 1831) – North America, Europe, Turkey, Caucasus, Russia (Europe to Far East), Central Asia, China, Japan
M. punctata Banks, 1896 – USA
M. riggsi Gertsch, 1942 – USA, Canada
M. rossica Thorell, 1875 – North America, Europe, Turkey, Caucasus, Russia (Europe to Far East), Central Asia, Mongolia, China
M. seminola Gertsch, 1942 – USA
M. seymuria Tuneva, 2004 – Kazakhstan
M. silesiaca L. Koch, 1875 – Europe, Caucasus, Russia (Europe to South Siberia)
M. siniloana Barrion & Litsinger, 1995 – Philippines
M. sociabilis Kulczyński, 1897 – Europe, Azerbaijan
M. subopaca Westring, 1861 – Europe, Russia (Europe to South Siberia, Kamchatka)
M. tarabaevi Mikhailov, 1988 – Kazakhstan
M. tersissima Simon, 1910 – South Africa
M. triangulosa Gertsch, 1935 – USA
M. triguttata Simon, 1884 – Spain, France, Algeria
M. tripunctata Holm, 1978 – USA (Alaska), Canada, Northern Europe, Russia (Europe to Far East)
M. tuvensis Danilov, 1993 – Russia (Central Asia, South Siberia), Kazakhstan, China
M. utahna Gertsch, 1933 – USA
M. vinnula Gertsch & Davis, 1936 – USA
M. violens Oliger, 1983 – Russia (Far East)
M. xiningensis Hu, 2001 – China
M. yeniseica Marusik & Koponen, 2002 – Russia (Middle Siberia)
M. yushuensis Hu, 2001 – China
M. zonsteini (Mikhailov, 2016) – Azerbaijan, Kyrgyzstan

References

Araneomorphae genera
Cosmopolitan spiders
Gnaphosidae